Tina Lingsch (born 23 December 2001) is a Chilean footballer who plays as a goalkeeper for Borussia Mönchengladbach in the German Frauen-Regionalliga West.

References